Zhongtang is a town under the administration of Binhai, Tianjin, China. , it has 24 villages and one industrial park under its administration.

References 

Towns in Tianjin